Michel Visi (* 24 October 1954 in Ningfire, Ambae, Vanuatu – † 19 May 2007 in Port Vila, Vanuatu) was the bishop of the Roman Catholic Diocese of Port-Vila. He also served as the head of Vanuatu's Vanuatu Christian Council, an important interdenominational organization.

Visi was originally from the island of Ambae in the northern part of Vanuatu.  He was ordained as a Catholic priest on 15 December 1982 at the age of 28.  He was appointed to be the Bishop of Vanuatu on 12 April 1997 by Pope John Paul II to succeed bishop Francis Lambert.  He was the first indigenous Vanuatuan to be appointed to this post.

Visi was found dead in his bedroom in Port Vila on 19 May 2007.  His funeral was held on 22 May at the Port Vila Roman Catholic Cathedral.  His funeral was officiated by the Nouméa Archbishop Michel-Marie-Bernard Calvet.

External links and references
Pacific News: Vanuatu Bishop Michel Visi Dies Aged 52
Radio New Zealand International: Vanuatu mourns the death of Bishop Michel Visi

1954 births
2007 deaths
20th-century Roman Catholic bishops in Oceania
21st-century Roman Catholic bishops in Oceania
Vanuatuan Roman Catholic bishops
People from Penama Province
Roman Catholic bishops of Port-Vila